Ayu-mi-x 6: Gold and Ayu-mi-x 6: Silver are two remix albums released by Japanese pop singer Ayumi Hamasaki on March 26, 2008. This is her sixth entry in the ayu-mi-x remix album series, and her first ayu-mi-x album since 2003's Ayu-mi-x V. Including 2005's My Story Classical, it's her first remix album in roughly four years.

Gold

Track listing
 Step You (The Young Punx! Remix Edit) 
 Moments (DJ Kentaro Full Mix) 
 Talkin' 2 Myself (Stonebrigde Radio Edit) 
 Beautiful Fighters (Al-P MSTRKRFT Radio Edit) 
 Inspire (Armand Van Helden Radio Edit) 
 Greatful Days (Para One Remix) 
 Startin' (Shinichi Osawa Remix) 
 Glitter (Soul Central Remix) 
 Blue Bird (7th Gate Snow Bird Remix) 
 Ourselves (Coldcut Club Mix) 
 Ladies Night (Afra & Incredible Beatbox Band Remix) 
 Happy Ending (Mad Professor Remix)

Charts
Oricon Overall Sales Chart (Japan)

Overall Sales Chart (Asia)

Silver

Track listing
 Game (Yoji's Remix - Radio Edit) 
 Together When... (Co-Fusion Remix) 
 No Way to Say (High Contrast Main Mix) 
 Alterna (Freeform Five Remix Edit) 
 Heaven (Daishi Dance Remix with Chieko Kinbara - Radio Edit) 
 Fated (Makoto Remix - Edit) 
 About You (Black Strobe Edit) 
 Decision (Force of Nature Remix Original Edit) 
 Jewel (Stéphane Pompougnac Main Version Edit Remix) 
 Carols (Playgroup Radio Edit) 
 Part of Me (Carl Craig Remix - Radio Edit) 
 Walking Proud (Calm's Balearic Remix Radio Edit)

Charts
Oricon Overall Sales Chart (Japan)

Overall Sales Chart (Asia)

References

External links
 Ayumi Hamasaki's official website 
 TeamAyu (official fansite)

Ayumi Hamasaki remix albums
2008 remix albums